Harttia canastra is a species of catfish in the family Loricariidae. It is native to South America, where it occurs in the São Francisco River basin in Brazil. The species reaches at least 10.9 cm (4.3 inches) in standard length. It was described in 2022 by Laís Caldas, Arieli M. Cherobim, and Francisco Langeani of São Paulo State University on the basis of its distinctive morphology. FishBase does not list this species.

References 

canastra
Fish described in 2022
Catfish of South America
Fish of the São Francisco River basin